Gary Taylor may refer to:

Gary Taylor (strongman) (born 1961), British winner of the 1993 World's Strongest Man competition
Gary Taylor (scholar) (born 1953), American professor and writer
Gary L. Taylor (born 1938), American district court judge
Gary Taylor (singer/songwriter), American singer, songwriter and producer
Gene Taylor (Mississippi politician), American politician
Gary Taylor (journalist) (born 1947), American journalist
Gary Taylor (baseball) American baseball player
Gary Taylor (bassist), American bassist, singer and songwriter
Gary Taylor (American football), American football coach

See also
Gareth Taylor (born 1973), English-Welsh footballer